Jessie Andrews is an American designer, producer, model, DJ, and former adult film actress. Andrews was active in the adult film industry from 2010 to 2015, where she was honored with several Acting Awards for her performance in Portrait of a Call Girl, as well as Best New Starlet awards.

In 2012, Andrews launched her own jewelry line Bagatiba (bagātība being Latvian for opulence). She has modeled for clothing companies, American Apparel, RVCA, and The Hundreds. She writes a sex advice column for Galore Magazine.

Career

Pornography
While in high school, Andrews was working as a sales associate for American Apparel. There, one of her friends who had worked as an extra in an adult film, told her "how much she made for showing her boobs," which motivated Andrews to look for work in the industry. She moved to Los Angeles, California in late 2010 to further her career after leaving high school. Andrews performed in over 140 adult films with men and women.

In 2012, Andrews was featured in the music video for Borgore's song "Decisions" which features Miley Cyrus. In January 2014, Andrews, Dana DeArmond, Asa Akira, and Chanel Preston were featured in a Cosmopolitan article titled "4 Porn Stars on How They Stay Fit". The article was inspired by actress Gabrielle Union's comment made on Conan O'Brien's talk show about striving to follow the fitness routines of the porn stars she saw at her gym.

Modeling and Design
Jessie became one of the few adult actress to break through to mainstream—proclaimed an "It Girl" by GQ, and Hypebae before getting scouted while shopping at an American Apparel store to be the brand's exclusive model. Jessie transitioned to a successful modeling career, gracing the covers of LA Weekly, Monster Children, and C-Heads.

In July 2012, Andrews started designing fine jewelry as a passion project. Her Bagatiba line became a celebrity favorite, worn by the Hadids, Jenner's & Kardashians. As the company grew, it appeared across the pages of many of the top fashion publications like Vogue and Refinery 29. Her online store's popularity grew to become one of the top performing stores on Shopify. Simultaneously, Andrews launched two other fashion brands: Basic Swim, a collection of affordable minimalist swimwear styles and Jeu Illimité, a Parisian-inspired ready-to-wear essentials line. Andrews oversees all three lines out of her downtown Los Angeles headquarters — 1201 B Studios.

By age 26, Jessie was interviewed by Forbes, Coveteur, Paper Magazine and International Business Times on how she is revolutionizing business and growth in the fashion industry. In an interview with Coveteur, she said "Porn and deejaying were careers that I knew weren't going to have longevity. I wanted to be able to build a future for myself, so I had given them a time cap. When I felt that I did as much as I could in that career, I was like, 'OK, what's next?' Designing is fulfilling, but I think owning your own brand and learning every different aspect of a business is what keeps me fulfilled and occupied."

Musical endeavors
In November 2012, Andrews released a remix for Anna Lunoe & Flume's "I Met You" and made it available for free download. In December, she released her remix of Disclosure and Sam Smith's "Latch".

In October and November 2013, Jessie Andrews embarked on a Canadian tour as a DJ. She performed in Montreal, Thunder Bay, Victoria, Edmonton, Vancouver and Calgary. Andrews also toured in Asia playing FLY in Singapore, We the Fest in Jakarta and Sunny Side Up Festival at Potato Head in Bali. In 2015 Jessie Andrews toured across North America playing to larger crowds in bigger venues like Marquee New York City, Exchange L.A, LIV Miami and Ultra Music Festival also in Miami. In November 2015 Andrews toured nationally across Australia with the largest festival in that country Stereosonic playing in Sydney, Melbourne, Perth, Adelaide and Brisbane as well as a sideshow in Sydney with Diplo. In 2016, Jessie released another single "Slowly" through OneLove Recordings.

In December 2014, El Paso's Children Hospital withdrew its participation from a fundraising event when it learned that Andrews was going to be the special guest DJ for the event. The event organizers continued with the event in support of another charity, the Ysleta Lions Club.

Singles

Remix EPs

Personal life
Andrews is of mixed heritage. On her mother's side, she is of Irish and Latvian descent. On her father's side, she is one quarter Singaporean. In 2010, Andrews was withdrawn from high school after her school discovered her porn career and headed west to Los Angeles later that year.

Awards

References

External links

 
 
 
 

Actresses from Orlando, Florida
American DJs
American female adult models
American pornographic film actresses
American jewelry designers
Women DJs
Living people
Pornographic film actors from Florida
American people of Irish descent
American people of Latvian descent
21st-century American women musicians
Penthouse Pets
Women jewellers
Year of birth missing (living people)